Steiria was a deme of ancient Attica on the east coast, between Prasiae and Brauron. Stiris in Phocis is said to have been founded by the inhabitants of this deme. The road from Attica to Steiria and the harbour of Prasiae was called the Στειριακὴ ὁδός. Steiria was the deme of Theramenes and Thrasybulus.

Steiria is located west of Porto Rafti.

People
Theramenes (d. 404 BCE), Athenian statesman
Thrasybulus, Athenian general

References

Populated places in ancient Attica
Former populated places in Greece
Demoi